The following list is albums on which the reggae/dancehall musician Sizzla performs.

Studio albums

Compilations

Live albums

Appearances

References

Reggae discographies
Discographies of Jamaican artists